Never Never Land is the debut album by jazz singer Jane Monheit, recorded when she was 22 years old. At AllMusic, critic David Adler wrote that her voice on this album was "as close to flawless as a human can get". She was accompanied by jazz musicians Bucky Pizzarelli, Ron Carter, Hank Crawford, and Kenny Barron. The album includes cover versions of the standards "More Than You Know", "My Foolish Heart", and "Twisted".

Track listing

Personnel
 Jane Monheit – vocals, vocal arrangement
 Hank Crawford – alto saxophone
 David "Fathead" Newman – flute, tenor saxophone
 Kenny Barron – piano
 Bucky Pizzarelli – guitar
 Ron Carter – bass
 Lewis Nash – drums

Production
 Joel Dorn – producer
 Carl Griffin – executive producer
 Tom Shick – engineer, mixing
 Todd Parker – assistant engineer
 Gene Paul – mastering, mixing
 David Berkman – arranger
 Peter Eldridge – arranger

References

2000 albums
Jane Monheit albums